The Iran women's national under-17 football team represents Iran in international women's under-17 football in the AFC U-16 Women's Championship and the FIFA U-17 Women's World Cup. It is controlled by the Iranian Football Federation.
Iran women's national under-17 football team has qualified to AFC U-16 Women's Championship twice in 2011 and 2013.

Fixtures and Results

Previous matches

Forthcoming matches

See also
Iran women's national football team
Iran women's national under-20 football team
Women's football in Iran

References

External links
Federation website
FIFA profile

Asian women's national under-17 association football teams
under-17
under-17